The Astoux-Védrines Triplane was a triplane fighter prototype designed and built in France during World War I. Powered by a  Clerget 9B rotary engine, the triplane was destroyed during flight testing and further development was abandoned. Very little else is known, other than that the name came from the designer, L. L. Astoux and the pilot Jules Védrines. After initial flights by monsieur Verdrines another pilot, a monsieur Simon, was flying the aircraft when the aircraft was destroyed in a crash.

Specifications

References

Military aircraft of World War I
Rotary-engined aircraft
Triplanes
Single-engined tractor aircraft